The American Elm cultivar Ulmus americana 'Queen City' was a selection made c. 1944 from a tree growing on the Lake Shore Boulevard in Toronto, Ontario, Canada.

Description
The tree was distinguished by its symmetric vase-shape, dense branching, the lateral branches extending horizontally, and smooth bark.

Cultivation
'Queen City' was first marketed by the Sheridan Nurseries, Toronto, Ontario, in 1949; it is not known to remain in cultivation.

Etymology
'Queen City' is a former nickname of Toronto.

References

American elm cultivar
Ulmus articles missing images
Ulmus